Chauncey Goodrich (October 20, 1759August 18, 1815) was an American lawyer and politician from Connecticut who represented that state in the United States Congress as both a senator (1807 to 1813) and a representative (1795 to 1801).

Biography
Goodrich was born in Durham in the Connecticut Colony, the son of Elizur Goodrich. He was graduated from Yale in 1776 and taught school afterward.  From 1779 to 1781 he taught at Yale.  After studying law, he was admitted to the Connecticut bar in 1781, practicing in Hartford.

Political career 
He served in the Connecticut House of Representatives from 1793 to 1794, when he was elected as a Federalist to the Fourth Congress from the Second District of Connecticut.  He was re-elected to the Fifth and Sixth Congresses, serving from March 4, 1795 to March 3, 1801.  In the Sixth Congress, he served with his brother Elizur Goodrich.

Returning to Connecticut, he resumed his law practice and was on the Governor's Council from 1802 to 1807. The Connecticut General Assembly elected him to the United States Senate to complete the term of Uriah Tracy, who died, and re-elected him to a full term. On June 17, 1812, he voted against war with Britain, but the vote for war was 19 to 13.  He served in the Senate in the Tenth, Eleventh, Twelfth, and Thirteenth Congresses from October 25, 1807 to May 1813 when he resigned to become Lieutenant Governor of Connecticut. He was elected to that office in 1813, having also been elected Mayor of Hartford in 1812.

He served as both Mayor and Lieutenant Governor until his death in Hartford. In 1814-15 he was a Connecticut delegate to the Hartford Convention.

Family

Goodrich was married to Mary Ann Wolcott, daughter of Oliver Wolcott, a signer of the Declaration of Independence.  His nephew Chauncey Allen Goodrich was the son-in-law of Noah Webster and edited his Dictionary after Webster's death. Chauncey Allen Goodrich's sister Nancy was married to Henry Leavitt Ellsworth, lawyer, U.S. Patent Commissioner and son of Founding Father and Chief Justice Oliver Ellsworth. William Wolcott Ellsworth, twin brother of Henry Leavitt, was married to another of Noah Webster's daughters.

Notes

References

 Connecticut election results for U.S. Senate, 1807

External links

1759 births
1815 deaths
Members of the Connecticut House of Representatives
Connecticut lawyers
Members of the Connecticut General Assembly Council of Assistants (1662–1818)
Mayors of Hartford, Connecticut
Lieutenant Governors of Connecticut
United States senators from Connecticut
Burials at Grove Street Cemetery
Yale University alumni
Federalist Party United States senators
Federalist Party members of the United States House of Representatives from Connecticut
19th-century American lawyers